Killing the Chickens, to Scare the Monkeys is a 2011 short film directed by Jens Assur. The story is set in the People's Republic of China and consists of nine scenes where national politics and strategy have unforeseen consequences on a young teacher's life. The first scene of the movie is a 15-minute single take, without cuts.

The movie was shot in Sweden and Thailand and it was Assur's second short as a director and writer.

Background
The idea for the movie is based on a photograph, smuggled out of China, depicting a group of prisoners kneeling, awaiting their execution. Around the group, people can be seen chatting and even laughing.

Title
The title paraphrases an old Chinese idiom "Kill the chicken to scare the monkey" (lit. kill chicken scare monkey), which refers to making an example out of someone in order to threaten others, in the manner of pour encourager les autres. The movie implies that the Chinese government policy of executing dissidents is meant to deter others.

Festivals and awards
Directors' Fortnight
Cannes, France
May 2011

Nordisk Panorama
Århus, Denmark
Winner Best Short
September 2011

Madrid, Spain
Special Jury Mention: AlcineNovember 2011

Vendôme Film Festival
Vendome, France
Winner
December 2011

Prague Short Film Festival 2012
Prague, Czech Republic
Special Jury Mention

Clermont-Ferrand 2012
Clermont-Ferrand, France
Special Jury Mention

Minimalen Short Film Festival 2012
Trondheim, Norway
Best Film - Nordic Competition
Best Fiction - Nordic Competition

See also 
 Kill the chicken to scare the monkey, an old Chinese idiom

References

External links

Thai short films
Swedish short films
2011 short films
2011 films
2010s Mandarin-language films